Insalde e Porreiras is a civil parish in the municipality of Paredes de Coura, Portugal. It was formed in 2013, by the merger of the former parishes Insalde and Porreiras. The population in 2011 was 459, in an area of 17.59 km².

References

Freguesias of Paredes de Coura